Dimorphograptidae is an extinct family of graptolites.

Genera
List of genera from Maletz (2014):

†Akidograptus Davies, 1929
†Avitograptus Melchin et al., 2011
†Bulmanograptus Přibyl, 1948b
†Cardograptus Hundt, 1965
†Dimorphograptus Lapworth, 1876b
†Metadimorphograptus Přibyl, 1948b
†Parakidograptus Li & Ge, 1981

References

Graptolites
Prehistoric hemichordate families